Aikala is a village near the town of Kinnigoli. It is situated in Mangalore taluk of Dakshina Kannada district. It is commonly known as Pompei in the Konkani language.

Education
There is a college called Pompei College Aikala which offers courses in commerce and arts.

Religious Places
The Kirem Church, which is officially known as Our Lady of Remedies Church is located in Aikala.

References

Other Links
Pompei College ,Aikala

Localities in Mangalore
Villages in Dakshina Kannada district